Gralingen is a village in the commune of Putscheid, in north-eastern Luxembourg. , the village had a population of 132.

Putscheid
Villages in Luxembourg